"All That Money Wants" is a song by the English rock band the Psychedelic Furs, released by Columbia Records in July 1988 as a single from the band's best-of compilation album  All of This and Nothing. The B-side was "Birdland". In the UK, the same single was released on Columbia's CBS label.

The single reached No. 75 on the UK Singles Chart and No. 1 in the U.S. on Billboard's Alternative Songs chart.

Charts

See also 
List of Billboard number-one alternative singles of the 1980s

References

1988 singles
The Psychedelic Furs songs
1988 songs
Columbia Records singles
Songs written by Tim Butler
Songs written by John Ashton (musician)
Songs written by Richard Butler (singer)